Patricia Beth O'Kelley (born September 26, 1968) is an American actress and producer, best recognized as Marly Ehrhardt on the CBS sitcom The New Adventures of Old Christine (2006–10). She may also be known for her recurring role as Nicole Leahy on The WB television series Gilmore Girls (2003–04) as well as the lead role in the independent comedy film Weather Girl (2009).

Career
O'Kelley began her acting career in commercials. In the 1990s, she founded a resource center for aspiring actors in Chicago that provided workshops, career consultations and seminars. As of the late 1990s, she began her career on television, including guest-starring roles on Frasier, Suddenly Susan, Everybody Loves Raymond, Two and a Half Men, CSI: Crime Scene Investigation, Back to You, Malcolm in the Middle, and starring roles in the short-lived series Emeril and That Was Then. She also had a recurring role in The WB family drama series Gilmore Girls, portraying Luke's girlfriend and "short-term wife",  Nicole Leahy, from 2003 to 2004.

O'Kelley is best known for her portrayal of Marly Ehrhardt on the CBS sitcom The New Adventures of Old Christine, opposite Julia Louis-Dreyfus, from 2006 to 2010. In 2009, she also starred and executive produced the independent film Weather Girl. She later starred in two television pilots, and from 2011 to 2013 had a recurring role as Camille Boykewich in the ABC Family teen drama series, The Secret Life of the American Teenager. In 2013, O'Kelley starred in the Lifetime movie Missing at 17, and in next year was cast for second season of the Lifetime comedy-drama series Devious Maids, as Tanya Taseltof.

Personal life
O'Kelley was born in Melrose, Massachusetts, and grew up in La Grange, Illinois. She graduated from the University of Wisconsin, Madison. She lived in Los Angeles with her husband, Adam, and their two children; as of October 17, 2020, however, Kelley describes herself as "a single mom of two girls." In addition to acting, O'Kelley designs a line of greetings cards called Heartsongs.

Filmography

Film

Television

References

External links 

1968 births
Living people
University of Wisconsin–Madison alumni
American television actresses
People from Melrose, Massachusetts
People from La Grange, Illinois
American film actresses
20th-century American actresses
21st-century American actresses